Diplolopha is a genus of moths in the family Nolidae. It contains only one species, Diplolopha cycloptera, which is found in Central and South America, including Argentina, Colombia, Ecuador and Costa Rica. Both the genus and species were first described by Paul Dognin in 1911.

References

Chloephorinae